Chokhur Kand (also Romanized as Chokhūr Kand; also known as Chokhūr Kandī, Chūkhūr Kand, and Chūkhūr Kandī) is a village in Chaldoran-e Shomali Rural District, in the Central District of Chaldoran County, West Azerbaijan Province, Iran. At the 2006 census, its population was 343, in 57 families.

References 

Populated places in Chaldoran County